Lasjia hildebrandii, also known as Celebes nut, Sulawesi nut, Sulawesi macadamia or Hildebrand's macadamia, is a species of forest tree in the protea family that is endemic to the island of Sulawesi, Indonesia. Its closest relative is Lasjia erecta, also a Sulawesi endemic.

History
The tree was first described in 1952 by Dutch botanist Van Steenis as a species of Macadamia, but was transferred in 2008, in a paper in the American Journal of Botany by Peter Weston and Austin Mast, to the new genus Lasjia.

Description
The species grows to about 14 m in height by 10 m across. It produces edible nuts.

Distribution and habitat
The species occurs on the large Wallacean island of Sulawesi (formerly Celebes) in Indonesia, on well-drained soils in or near lowland tropical rainforest.

References

hildebrandii
Endemic flora of Sulawesi
Trees of Sulawesi
Taxa named by Cornelis Gijsbert Gerrit Jan van Steenis
Plants described in 1952